Brida Beccarelli (born 20 January 1957) is a Swiss sports shooter. She competed in the women's 25 metre pistol event at the 1984 Summer Olympics.

References

1957 births
Living people
Swiss female sport shooters
Olympic shooters of Switzerland
Shooters at the 1984 Summer Olympics
Place of birth missing (living people)